Connor Rutz (born April 9, 1997) is an American soccer player who plays for Detroit City in the USL Championship.

Career

Early career
Rutz played high school soccer at Walled Lake Northern High School before attending Schoolcraft College in 2016. Rutz scored five goals in 19 appearances in his single season with the Ocelots, before transferring to Saginaw Valley State University in 2017. With the Cardinals, Rutz scored 17 goals and tallied eight assists in 39 appearances, missing the entire 2018 season. In 2017, he was named All-GLIAC First Team midfielder, earned United Soccer Coaches First Team and D2CCA All-Midwest Region Second Team honors. In his senior year, Rutz was earned GLIAC Offensive Player of the Year and All-GLIAC First-Team honors, D2CCA All-Midwest Region Second-Team honors, was named to the United Soccer Coaches All-Midwest Region First-Team, and the United Soccer Coaches All-America Second-Team.

In 2018 and 2019, Rutz also appeared for USL League Two side Cincinnati Dutch Lions, making 26 appearances and scoring three goals.

Detroit City
Rutz joined National Independent Soccer Association club Detroit City FC for their 2020 season, scoring two goals in seven games, helping the team to become the Great Lakes Region champions. He stayed with the club in 2021, where the team were Great Lakes Champions, regular season champions and won the Legends Cup. He continued with the team in 2022 as the club made the move to the USL Championship.

Honors

Team
National Independent Soccer Association
Season Championship
Champions (2): 2020–21, 2021
Fall Championship
Champions (1): 2020
Legends Cup
Champions (1): 2021
NISA Independent Cup
Great Lakes Region
Champions (2): 2020, 2021

Individual
National Independent Soccer Association
NISA All-League first team: 2021

References

External links
NISA bio
SVSU bio
 

1997 births
Living people
American soccer players
Association football midfielders
Cincinnati Dutch Lions players
Detroit City FC players
National Independent Soccer Association players
People from Commerce, Michigan
Saginaw Valley State Cardinals men's soccer players
Soccer players from Michigan
USL Championship players
USL League Two players